Events during the year 2007 in Italy.

Incumbents
President: Giorgio Napolitano
Prime Minister: Romano Prodi

Events

Literature 
The Italian, novel by Sebastiano Vassalli
Manituana, novel by the writers' collective Wu Ming
The Track of Sand, novel by Andrea Camilleri

Deaths  

26 January – Emanuele Luzzati, painter, production designer and animator (b. 1921).
8 February – Adele Faccio, civil right activist (b. 1920).
26 February – Angelo Arcidiacono, fencer (b. 1955).
3 March – 
Osvaldo Cavandoli, cartoonist (b. 1920).
Benito Lorenzi, footballer (b. 1925).
19 March – Giampaolo Calanchini, fencer (b. 1937).
21 May – Bruno Mattei, film director, screenwriter and editor (b. 1931)
23 July – Franco Cuomo, writer (b. 1938).
24 July – Giorgio Anglesio, fencer (b. 1922).
6 September – Luciano Pavarotti, operatic tenor (b. 1935).
21 September – Mauro Mellano, Italian economist and university professor.
7 October – Luciana Frassati Gawronska, writer (b. 1902).
2 December – Eleonora Rossi Drago, actress (b. 1925).

References 

 
2000s in Italy
Years of the 21st century in Italy
Italy
Italy